Shir Govaz (also Romanized as Shīr Govāz and Shīr Gavāz) is a village in Bahu Kalat Rural District, Dashtiari District, Chabahar County, Sistan and Baluchestan Province, Iran. At the 2006 census, its population was 553, in 126 families.

References 

Populated places in Chabahar County